Paweł Kakietek (born 2 July 1975) is a Polish boxer. He competed in the men's middleweight event at the 2000 Summer Olympics.

References

1975 births
Living people
Polish male boxers
Olympic boxers of Poland
Boxers at the 2000 Summer Olympics
People from Milanówek
Sportspeople from Masovian Voivodeship
Middleweight boxers